King Ampaw is a Ghanaian filmmaker and actor born in Kukurantumi in the Eastern Region of Ghana. He is known for starring as the second lead role with the late Hollywood actor, Klaus Kinski in Werner Herzog's sensational film Cobra Verde (1987) which he also co-produced. He also co-produced the film  (1989) directed by Peter F. Bringmann. He is married with two sons.

Biography 
King Ampaw was born on 25 July 1940 in Kukurantumi in the Eastern Region of Ghana. He attended the Academy of Film in Potsdam, Germany in 1965. In 1966 he also enrolled at the Academy of Music and Performing Arts in Vienna, Austria and the Hochschule für Fernsehen und Film München, Germany (HFF Munich) from 1967 to 1972 where he studied with Werner Herzog and Wim Wenders. He graduated as a film director with his first film They Call it Love.

On his return to Ghana, he became a senior director at the Ghana Broadcasting Corporation (GBC) from 1979 to 1982 when he left GBC to form his own film company, Afro movies Ltd. King Ampaw wrote, directed and produced his own films such as Kukurantumi, Road to Accra (1983), Juju (1985) and No Time to Die (2006). Most of his films have been co-funded with his company Afromovies Ltd and international agencies and governments such as No Time to Die which was funded by the European Union and the French Government. His films have been praised internationally and have won numerous awards including the Film Critics Award for Kukurantumi, Road to Accra at FESPACO, the Input Film Award for Juju in Czech Republic and the Talifa Film Festival Award in Spain for No Time to Die.

He was the first Filmmaker to be given an Honorary Award at the African Movie Academy Awards (AMAA) in Nigeria. At the 2012 NAFTI Film Lectures, he was honoured for his immense contribution to the film industry and cross-cultural collaborations between Ghana and Germany. He also received another Lifetime Achievement Award in 2013 at the Accra International Film Festival. He is a founding member of FEPACI (African Filmmakers’ Union), FESPACO, the Ghana Academy of Film and Television Arts (GAFTA) and the Directors’ Guild of Ghana (DGG).

King Ampaw is currently working on a film titled "The Son and Sun of Africa", which is about the life of the legendary Pan-Africanist, Kwame Nkrumah which will be his last film, to complete his creative works.

Filmography 

 They Call it Love (1972)
 Kukurantumi, Road to Accra (1983)
 Juju (Nana Akoto) (1985)
 No Time to Die (2006)

Awards and Nomination 
In 2007, King Ampaw was awarded "Best Actor award at the 4th African Film Festival of Tarifa in Spain. He presented during the 20th anniversary of the "Pan-African Film and Arts Festival in Georgia, Atlanta, in 2008. He won The Film Critics Award for Kukurantumi at Fespaco in Ouagadougou and Input Film Award for Nana Akoto in Czechoslovakia He is also the winner of Honorary Award at an edition of the Africa Movie Academy Awards (AMAA), in Nigeria. Additionally, he was awarded a Lifetime Achievement Award at the Accra International Film Festival (AIFF) in 2013.

References 

1940 births
Living people
Ghanaian male actors
Ghanaian film directors
Ghanaian expatriates in Germany
Ghanaian expatriates in Austria
Ghanaian film producers